Celebration  is the self-titled second album release by the Mike Love fronted band Celebration. The album was released in February 1979 and mainly features song writing from Mike Love and Ron Altbach. The album also contains a Brian Wilson co-write called "How’s About A Little Bit". "Starbaby" and "Gettin' Hungry" were released as the lead singles for album. "Gettin' Hungry" was a cover of a Beach Boys track from 1967. The album was only released on LP and is currently out of print. It  has also long been difficult to find as it is estimated only 5,000 copies were pressed and released.

Track listing

"Gettin’ Hungry" (Brian Wilson/Mike Love) – 4:30
"Sailor" (Dave Robinson/Ron Altbach) – 3:07
"Lovestruck" (Ed Tuleja/Altbach) – 3:26
"She’s Just Out to Get You" (Love) – 3:12 
"I Don’t Wanna Know" (Love) – 3:31
"Starbaby" (Love) – 4:32
"Go and Get That Girl" (Tuleja/Altbach) – 3:06
"How’s About a Little Bit" (Wilson/Diane Rovell/Love/Altbach) – 2:34
"Song of Creation" (Robinson/Altbach) – 2:58
"Country Pie" (Tuleja/Altbach) – 3:16

Personnel
 Mike Love - Lead Vocals on 1, 4, 8 and 10
 Dave "Doc" Robinson - Bass and Lead Vocals on 2, 3, 5, 7 and 9
 Paul Fauerso - Keyboards and Lead Vocals on 6
 Ron Altbach - Keyboards
 Charles Lloyd - Saxophone
 Kim Calkins - Drums

References

Celebration (1970s band) albums
1979 albums